Opening Doors may refer to:

 "Opening Doors" (Desperate Housewives), a TV episode
 Opening Doors, a version of the musical revue Sondheim on Sondheim
 "Opening Doors", a 1949 short story by Wilmar H. Shiras
  Opening Doors, a plan of the United States Interagency Council on Homelessness

See also
Opening Doors to Recovery, an American mental health project